Lasa is a village in the Paphos District of Cyprus, located 2 km west of Fyti. Lasa is a small village in the province of Paphos in Cyprus and it is situated 27 kilometers  northeast of the homonymous city, 82 kilometers northwest of Limassol and 151 kilometers southwest of Nicosia. 

A small community situated at 600 m, with approximately 100 residents is nearby Drinia, Drimou, and Lasa.

References

Communities in Paphos District